Luka Jović (born 23 December 1997) is a Serbian professional footballer who plays as a striker for  club Fiorentina and the Serbia national team.

Early life
Jović was born in Loznica, FR Yugoslavia. He was raised in the small village of Batar near Bijeljina, to Bosnian Serb parents Milan and Svetlana Jović. At the age of five, he started playing football in Loznica, where he was spotted in 2004 and offered to play in Mini Maxi, a development league for kids aged between 4 and 12 in Belgrade. After just one game where Jović scored three goals his father was offered €50 for each game he played and 2,000 dinars for travelling costs from Batar to Belgrade. At one of those games he was scouted by Toma Milićević, Red Star's scout who invited him to trial with Red Star Belgrade. His playing style attracted comparisons to Darko Pančev and Radamel Falcao, who is also his idol.

Club career

Red Star Belgrade

Youth
Jović was offered the chance to play for Red Star Belgrade in 2005. Before he committed, his father took him to train with Partizan, who had been trying to sign Jović for some time. They offered his father €200 per month for Jović to play with them, but he insisted on staying with Red Star.

2013–14 season
On 28 May 2014, at the age of 16 years, five months and five days, Jović made his professional debut against FK Vojvodina in Novi Sad, where he broke Dejan Stanković's record as the youngest goalscorer in a competitive match in the club's history. He scored the goal only two minutes after he was brought on as substitute, and the final score of 3–3 was enough to give Red Star the 2013–14 Serbian SuperLiga title.

2014–15 season
On 18 October 2014, Jović became the youngest player ever to play in Eternal derby at the age of 16 years, 9 months and 25 days, breaking the previous record of Dejan Milovanović who was 17 years and 6 months old at the time. Jović missed some crucial chances, but in spring half of the season scored six goals. His first goal of the season came against Vojvodina, in a match where Red Star celebrated its 70th birthday. He then scored against Spartak, a double against Borac and a decisive goal against Voždovac, ahead of the Eternal derby clash. He missed the end of the season and the 2015 FIFA U-20 World Cup in New Zealand due to injury. On 17 May 2015, he signed a three-year contract with Red Star to last until 2018.

2015–16 season
From the beginning of the 2015–16 season, Jović started as a first choice in Red Star attack along with Hugo Vieira and scored 3 goals in first 5 games. He scored again against Voždovac a winning goal and brought another win to Red Star at Stadion na Vračaru. He scored another game winner in Subotica, against Spartak. In November 2015, a racketeer from Loznica threatened him and his family that if they did not pay money to him, that he would "break Jović's legs". A suspect was apprehended immediately afterwards.

Benfica
In February 2016, Jović signed with Portuguese champions Benfica until 2021. On 9 March, he debuted for the club's reserve team in a 2–2 home draw against Sporting da Covilhã in the Segunda Liga. He debuted for the first-team on 20 March, as a substitute, in a 1–0 away victory against Boavista in the Primeira Liga.

On 30 January 2017, Jović made his only appearance for the first team when he came on as a substitute in the 81st minute against Vitória de Setúbal.

Loan to Eintracht Frankfurt

2017–18 season
In June 2017, Jović joined Eintracht Frankfurt on a two-season loan while his new club secured an option to sign him on a permanent basis. He made five appearances as they won the 2017–18 DFB-Pokal, and scored the only goal of the win at Schalke 04 in the semi-finals on 18 April 2018, but was an unused substitute in the 3–1 final win over Bayern Munich.

2018–19 season
20-year-old Jović became the youngest player to score five goals in a Bundesliga game when he did so in a 7–1 home win over Fortuna Düsseldorf on 19 October 2018. On 14 March 2019, he scored the only goal, his seventh for the campaign, in a 1–0 win over Inter Milan to secure the club's progression to the quarter finals of the Europa League. In doing so, he helped Eintracht become the first German club ever to record eight wins in a single season in the competition.

On 17 April 2019, Eintracht Frankfurt exercised a clause in Jović's contract to make his loan move permanent until 30 June 2023. In May 2019, he scored in both semi-final legs against Chelsea, yet Eintracht Frankfurt lost 4–3 on penalties after drawing 1–1 in both matches. However, Jović managed to score ten goals in total in the Europa League season.

Real Madrid

2019–20 season

On 4 June 2019, Jović signed for Real Madrid for a reported €60 million, on a six-year contract. He made his debut on 17 August 2019, coming in as a substitute in a 3–1 win over Celta Vigo. On 30 October 2019, he scored his first goal for the club in a 5–0 victory over CD Leganés.

Jović started both semi-final and final match of 2019–20 Supercopa de España against Valencia and Atlético Madrid, respectively. Real won the final 4–1 on penalties on 12 January 2020, earning Jović his first trophy as a Real Madrid player. During an injury riddled season, he made 17 appearances during the league season, while scoring two goals, as Real Madrid won the 2019–20 La Liga title.

Loan to Eintracht Frankfurt 
On 14 January 2021, Jović was loaned back to his former club Eintracht Frankfurt until the end of the 2020–21 season. On 17 January, in his first match back with his former club, Jović came off the bench and scored two goals within half an hour as Frankfurt defeated Schalke 3–1.

Fiorentina
On 8 July 2022, Fiorentina announced the signing of Jović.

International career
On 11 December 2013, Jović scored a hat-trick for Serbia U-17 in a 4–1 win against Croatia U-17. In July 2014, he was called up by youth coach Veljko Paunović to Serbia's U-19 squad for the 2014 UEFA European Under-19 Championship.

In May 2018, Jović was named in Serbia's preliminary squad for the FIFA World Cup in Russia. On 4 June, he made his international debut in a friendly match against Chile, coming on as a substitute for Aleksandar Mitrović in the 84th minute. Later in June, Jović was included in the final 23-man squad for the 2018 FIFA World Cup, where he appeared as a late substitute against Brazil.

On 20 March 2019, Jović scored his debut goal for the national team in a friendly against Germany.

In November, 2022 he was selected in Serbia's squad for the 2022 FIFA World Cup in Qatar. He played in group stage matches against Cameroon and Switzerland. Serbia finished fourth in the group.

Personal life
When Jović was 10 years old, his older sister survived leukemia. He stated that period had "left a mark on their lives" and had motivated him to become a "fighter like she".

On 25 February 2019, Jović became a father of a baby boy, David, with his former girlfriend Anđela Manitašević, whom he split up with in 2016. As of summer 2019, he is in a relationship with Serbian model Sofija Milošević. They have two children: Aleksej Jović (born 2020) and Teodor Jović (born 2022).

On 18 March 2020, amid the COVID-19 pandemic, Jović broke Serbia's self-isolation protocol by flying from Madrid to Belgrade to attend Milošević's birthday party, drawing criticism from Prime Minister of Serbia Ana Brnabić herself and facing possible charges. On 30 December 2021, he tested positive for COVID-19.

Career statistics

Club

International

Serbia score listed first, score column indicates score after each Jović goal.

Honours
Red Star Belgrade
Serbian SuperLiga: 2013–14

Benfica
Primeira Liga: 2015–16, 2016–17

Eintracht Frankfurt
DFB-Pokal: 2017–18

Real Madrid
La Liga: 2019–20, 2021–22
Supercopa de España: 2019–20, 2021–22
UEFA Champions League: 2021–22

Individual
UEFA Europa League Squad of the Season: 2018–19
Bundesliga Team of the Season: 2018–19

References

External links

 Profile at the ACF Fiorentina website 
 Player profile on Serbian National Team page
 

1997 births
Living people
Sportspeople from Loznica
People from Bijeljina
Serbian footballers
Association football forwards
Red Star Belgrade footballers
S.L. Benfica B players
S.L. Benfica footballers
Eintracht Frankfurt players
Real Madrid CF players
ACF Fiorentina players
Serbian SuperLiga players
Liga Portugal 2 players
Primeira Liga players
Bundesliga players
La Liga players
Serie A players
Serbia youth international footballers
Serbia under-21 international footballers
Serbia international footballers
2018 FIFA World Cup players
2022 FIFA World Cup players
Serbian expatriate footballers
Serbian expatriate sportspeople in Portugal
Serbian expatriate sportspeople in Germany
Serbian expatriate sportspeople in Spain
Serbian expatriate sportspeople in Italy
Expatriate footballers in Portugal
Expatriate footballers in Germany
Expatriate footballers in Spain
Expatriate footballers in Italy
UEFA Champions League winning players